The red-faced barbet (Lybius rubrifacies) is a species of bird in the African barbet family Lybiidae.
It is found in Burundi, Rwanda, Northwest Tanzania, and Southwest Uganda.
Its natural habitats are dry savanna, moist savanna, and arable land.
It is threatened by habitat loss.

Description
This barbet is one of the smaller of the Lybius species at only  in length. It has red coloring on the side of the face and around the eye, but is black on the dorsal side of the head. Its entire body is black and its wings are streaked with yellow. This type of barbet is sexually monomorphic, meaning that both the males and females are generally similar in morphology, size and behavior.

Bird Calls
This species is one that does utilize duets in order to communicate with mates and other individuals. Duet singing is intricately timed and can be quite complex. It also takes the birds a while to develop their own personal version of a particular song. The duet repertoire hardly varies and it uses antiphonal duets in pairs. The two birds in the pair each have two distinct sexual duet roles after the greeting ceremony. Duets sung in pairs are crucial for the establishment and holding of a territory. In order for these barbets to hold a territory and breed, they must find a suitable barbet mate in their species to synchronize in duets with.

References

red-faced barbet
Birds of East Africa
red-faced barbet
Taxonomy articles created by Polbot